Ptinus subpilosus is a species of beetles in the genus Ptinus of the family Ptinidae.

References

subpilosus
Beetles described in 1837